Hoad Monument (proper name: the Sir John Barrow Monument) is a  tower at the top of the  Hoad Hill, near Ulverston in the Cumbria. England. It commemorates Sir John Barrow (1764-1848), who was born in Ulverston, and was built in 1850 at a cost of £1250. The cost being met mainly by public subscription

Sir John Barrow was a founding member of the Royal Geographical Society. He travelled to China and South Africa as a diplomat and held the post of Second Secretary to the Admiralty from 1804 until 1845.

Description

The monument is not a lighthouse: it has never had a functional light.  However, it was designed to resemble one, and is similar to the Third Eddystone Lighthouse (Smeaton's Tower). It is a Grade II* listed building, meaning that it is of more than local interest, and the monument stands as one of the symbols of the Northwest of England.

It is built of limestone quarried locally at Birkrigg Common. Due to its elevated and exposed position, it is one of the most prominent landmarks in Cumbria. The hollow tower can be ascended via a spiral stone staircase of 112 steps. At the top, eight apertures provide a 360-degree panorama of the Furness Peninsula, Morecambe Bay and the southern Lake District. In recent times the formerly open apertures have been glazed.

Sometimes simply known as "Hoad", the tower is also occasionally referred to as "the pepper pot". This epithet was famously used by Lord Haw-Haw during one of his propaganda broadcasts of World War II when he warned the residents of Ulverston that the German Air Force would bomb their pepper pot.

Hoad Monument is normally open during the summer months when a flag is flying outside the monument. Ulverston Towns Lands Trust owns both the monument and Hoad Hill.

Restoration
In 2009/2010 the monument underwent a £1.2 million restoration.  The majority of funding came in the form of a £891,000 grant from the Heritage Lottery Fund with the Friends of the Sir John Barrow Monument collecting grants and donations for the rest.

The restoration included a series of structural improvements to make the monument watertight, the most noticeable of these being the addition of a copper roof covering the stone dome, which was itself removed and rebuilt.

The official reopening was on Sunday 22 August 2010 and was marked by a gala at Ford Park, barn dance and firework display.

See also

Grade II* listed buildings in South Lakeland
Listed buildings in Ulverston

References 

 A Story of the Growth of Ulverston, by Dorothy Ashburner. Published 1993 (No ISBN available).

External links 
Friends of the Sir John Barrow Monument

Ulverston
Grade II* listed buildings in Cumbria
Monuments and memorials in Cumbria